The Beretta Stampede is a single-action revolver manufactured by Beretta that is a close clone of the Colt Single Action Army "Peacemaker".   The main difference is that the Beretta utilizes a transfer bar like the Ruger Vaquero which makes the gun safe to carry a full 6 rounds.

Variants

Stampede Old West 
This is the second Stampede. It has a fixed front sight, wood grip, and holds .45 Long Colt rounds, the same as the Colt Peacemaker. Its cylinder capacity is six rounds, as are the others.

Stampede Old West Marshal 
This was the third model of the Stampede series by Beretta. It was made for those who wanted a shorter version of the revolver. It has a fixed front sight and a polished wood "bird's head" style grip. It was available chambered in both the .45 Long Colt and .357 Magnum cartridges. The gun is  inches long, and its barrel is  inches.

Stampede Buntline Carbine 
This is probably the most major of changes in the Stampede revolver line, and features a very long 18" barrel and a wood shoulder stock. It still is single-action with fixed sights, holding six .45 Long Colt cartridges. It is 34 inches long. (One must be careful when firing this or any revolving rifle, because of the side-blast at the junction of cylinder and barrel.)

Stampede Gemini 
This model of the Stampede was made for people who prefer larger-framed revolvers. It is in a dimmer shade of silver, and has a darker-colored wood grip and a larger frame than the regular Stampede Old West. It has a fixed front sight with a -inch barrel and 11 inches total length, and holds six 45 Long Colt cartridges.

Stampede Philadelphia 
This is a heavier model of the Stampede Old West, with smooth walnut grips. It weighs about 1/2 pound more than the Stampede Old West, 3.76 pounds (60 ounces) unloaded.

Stampede Deluxe 
This is a more exclusive version of the Stampede Old West. This revolver is also available in .357 Magnum, but both models hold six rounds. It has three different barrel lengths,  and  inches. It has walnut grips and a fixed front sight.

Stampede Inox 
This is a standard Stampede Old West with an Inox finish. This gun has a black polymer grip, and the rest of it is stainless steel. It takes six .45 Long Colt cartridges. It has a fixed front sight and a " barrel.
It comes with a 4 and 3/4" barrel as well. It also takes .45 Colt cartridges.

Stampede Bisley 
This is a model of the Stampede with a bent-down polymer or walnut grip like the original Bisley Colts. It is popular with people who want a closer reach to the trigger, which this bent-down grip provides; the revolver also is less prone to twisting upward in the hand when fired, making it better for target shooters. It has a fixed sight and a " barrel, and uses .45 Long Colt cartridges.

Stampede 
This is the original Stampede. It is available in a blued finish, nickel finish, or Inox. It has a " barrel, a fixed front sight and wood, walnut or polymer grips.

See also 
 Beretta Laramie
 Colt Peacemaker

External links

Beretta USA official website, Stampede page
Ballistics By The Inch test data for the Beretta Stampede

Stampede
Revolvers of Italy
.357 Magnum firearms
.45 Colt firearms